Kim Jin-pyo (born August 13, 1977) is a South Korean MC, rapper, singer, songwriter, television presenter and professional race car driver. He began his career in 1995 as one half of the duo Panic, together with his childhood friend Lee Juck, and went on to release music both as a solo artist and as a member of the rock group Nova Sonic. In 2003, he won the Mnet Music Video Festival award for Best Hip Hop Performance. He is currently the host of Top Gear Korea and of Show Me The Money.

Kim is married to actress Yoon Joo-ryeon (ko) and they have a daughter. He appeared with their daughter in the reality show Dad! Where Are We Going?.

Discography

Studio albums 
 1998: Exception (列外)
 1998: JP Style
 2001: JP 3	
 2003: JP 4
 2004: Best - Remastering All about JP
 2008: Galanty Show
 2012: JP 6
 2013: JP 7

Mini albums 
 2009: Romantic Winter (Romantic 겨울)
 2013: 5 Break-Up Stories

Collaborations 
 쿨하게 헤어지는 방법, with 잔디, Blue Brand 1st 12 Doors, 2009
 아무 말도 하지마, with K.Will, Blue Brand 2nd Trauma, 2010
 어쩜, with Jessica, Wild Romance OST, 2012
 아저씨, with J Rabbit, Single, 2012

Awards

References 

K-pop singers
South Korean male rappers
South Korean television presenters
Rappers from Seoul
1977 births
Living people
MAMA Award winners
Music Farm artists